The Massachusetts Supreme Judicial Court (SJC) is the highest court in the Commonwealth of Massachusetts. Although the claim is disputed by the Supreme Court of Pennsylvania, the SJC claims the distinction of being the oldest continuously functioning appellate court in the Americas, with a recognized history dating to the establishment of the Massachusetts Superior Court of Judicature in 1692 under the charter of the Province of Massachusetts Bay.

Although it was historically composed of four associate justices and one chief justice, the court is currently composed of six associate justices and one chief justice.

History
The Massachusetts Supreme Judicial Court traces its history back to the high court of the British Province of Massachusetts Bay, which was chartered in 1692. Under the terms of that charter, Governor Sir William Phips established the Superior Court of Judicature as the province's local court of last resort (some of the court's decisions could be appealed to courts in England). When the Massachusetts State Constitution was established in 1780, legislative and judicial records show that the state's high court, although renamed, was a continuation of provincial high court. During and after the period of the American Revolution the court had members who were appointed by royal governors, the executive council of the Massachusetts Provincial Congress (which acted as the state's executive from 1775 to 1780), and governors elected under the state constitution.

Location and citation
The SJC sits at the John Adams Courthouse, One Pemberton Square, Boston, Massachusetts 02108, which also houses the Massachusetts Appeals Court and the Social Law Library. The legal citation for the Massachusetts Supreme Judicial Court is "Mass."

Landmark cases
 Rex v. Preston (1770) – Captain Thomas Preston, the Officer of the Day during the Boston Massacre, was acquitted when the jury was unable to determine whether he had ordered the troops to fire.  The defense counsel in the case was a young attorney named John Adams, later the second President of the United States.
 Rex v. Wemms, et al. (1770) – Six soldiers involved in the Boston Massacre were found not guilty, and two morethe only two proven to have firedwere found guilty of manslaughter.
 Commonwealth v. Nathaniel Jennison (1783) – The Court declared slavery unconstitutional in the state of Massachusetts by allowing slaves to sue their masters for freedom. Boston lawyer, and member of the Massachusetts Constitutional Convention of 1779, John Lowell, upon the adoption of Article I for inclusion in the Massachusetts Constitution, exclaimed: "I will render my services as a lawyer gratis to any slave suing for his freedom if it is withheld from him ..." With this case, he fulfilled his promise. Slavery in Massachusetts was denied legal standing.
 Commonwealth v. Hunt (1842) – The Court established that trade unions were not necessarily criminal or conspiring organizations if they did not advocate violence or illegal activities in their attempts to gain recognition through striking. This legalized the existence of non-socialist or non-violent trade organizations, though trade unions would continue to be harassed legally through anti-trust suits and injunctions.
 Roberts v. Boston (1850) – The Court established the "separate but equal" doctrine that would later be used in Plessy v. Ferguson by maintaining that the law gave school boards complete authority in assigning students to schools and that they could do so along racial lines if they deemed it appropriate.
 Goodridge v. Department of Public Health (2003) – The Court ruled 4–3 that the denial of marriage licenses to same-sex couples violated the Massachusetts Constitution. The decision was stayed for 180 days to allow the legislature time to amend the law to comply with the decision. In December 2003, the state Senate asked the SJC whether "civil unions" would comply with their ruling. The SJC replied that civil unions were insufficient, and civil marriage was required. The legislature made no further action, and the stay expired on May 17, 2004. The state began issuing marriage licenses to same-sex couples the same day. This decision was one of the first in the world to find that same-sex couples have a right to marry.

Composition
The Court consists of a Chief Justice and six Associate Justices appointed by the Governor of Massachusetts with the consent of the Governor's Council.

The Justices hold office until the mandatory retirement age of seventy, like all other Massachusetts judges since 1972.

Current composition

The currently serving justices are:

Notable members
 William Cushing, Associate Justice of the Supreme Court of the United States (1790–1810)
Charles Devens, United States Attorney General (1877–81)
Charles Fried, United States Solicitor General (1985–89)
Horace Gray, Associate Justice of the Supreme Court of the United States (1882–1902)
Ebenezer R. Hoar, United States Attorney General (1869–70)
Oliver Wendell Holmes Jr., Associate Justice of the Supreme Court of the United States (1902–32)
Lemuel Shaw, Chief Justice, father-in-law of Herman Melville
Theophilus Parsons, Federalist leader, Constitutional scholar

Notes

References

Works cited
 Davis, William (1900).  History of the Judiciary of Massachusetts
  Massachusetts Civil List for the Colonial and Provincial Periods
 Reno, Conrad. Memoirs of the Judiciary and the Bar of New England, Volume 1

External links

Supreme Judicial Court of Massachusetts
List of Chief Justices of the Supreme Judicial Court (since 1801)
Office of the Reporter of Decisions of the SJC
. (Various documents).
Gay-Marriage Decision: Just the Beginning of the Debate
Memoirs v. Massachusetts
Simpson's Contemporary Quotations

 
State supreme courts of the United States
Massachusetts state courts
1692 establishments in Massachusetts
Government Center, Boston
Courts and tribunals established in 1692